Ayogya may refer to:

Ayogya (2018 film), Kannada film
Ayogya (2019 film), Tamil film